Djama is a surname. Notable people with the surname include:

 Darar Djama Aboubaker (born 1989), Djiboutian footballer
 Houssein Djama (born 1968), Djiboutian middle-distance runner
 Nima Djama (born 1948), Djiboutian composer and singer
 Sofia Djama (born 1979), Algerian film director